Mark Morton may refer to:
 Mark Morton (politician) (1865–1938), New South Wales politician
 Mark Morton (businessman) (1858–1951), co-founder of Morton Salt
 Mark Morton (guitarist) (born 1972), guitarist with Lamb of God
 Mark Morton (double bassist) (born 1962), professor of double bass at Texas Tech University